The Voice of Africa is the 1964 fourth album of Miriam Makeba issued by RCA Victor. It charted at #122 on the US album chart.

Track listing
"Nomthini" (Miriam Makeba, Alan Salinga)	1:51
"Willow Song" (Giuseppe Verdi)	2:45
"Langa More" (Zeph Nkabinde)	2:20
"Shihibolet"	1:49
"Tuson" (Julio Perez)	1:58
"Qhude" (Miriam Makeba, Hugh Masekela)	2:40
"Mayibuye" (Miriam Makeba, Christopher Songxaka)	2:45
"Lovely Lies" (Joe Glazer, Mackay Davashe)	2:42
"Uyadela" (Miriam Makeba)	2:30
"Mamoriri" (Miraim Makeba)	1:40
"Le Fleuve" (Stephane Golmann)	2:00
"Come to Glory" 2:30

Personnel
Miriam Makeba - vocals
Laura Brower, Marvin Falcon, Samuel Brown - guitar
William Salter - bass guitar
Auchee Lee - drums, percussion
Hugh Masekela - trumpet, arranger, conductor
Morris Goldberg - alto saxophone
James Cleveland - trombone

References

1964 albums
Miriam Makeba albums
Albums produced by Hugo & Luigi
RCA Victor albums